Ding Yuhuan (丁•雨欢 ; born 3 October 2003 in Bayannur) is a Chinese biathlete. She competed at the 2022 Winter Olympics, in Women's individual, and Women's sprint.

She competed at the 2020 Youth Olympic Games.

References 

Living people
2003 births
Chinese female biathletes
Olympic biathletes of China
Biathletes at the 2022 Winter Olympics
Biathletes at the 2020 Winter Youth Olympics
Sportspeople from Inner Mongolia